Alija "Al" Dumas (born October 19, 1929) Was a former Democratic member of the Pennsylvania House of Representatives. He received an honorary street renaming in February 2020.

References

Democratic Party members of the Pennsylvania House of Representatives
Living people
1929 births